Andrea Tranquilli (born 5 February 1986) is an Italian male rower, medal winner at senior level at the European Rowing Championships.

References

External links
 

1986 births
Living people
Italian male rowers
Rowers of Fiamme Gialle